Valeri Nikolayevich Bragin (born May 31, 1956) is the current assistant coach of SKA Saint Petersburg of the Kontinental Hockey League (KHL). He is also a retired ice hockey forward. He is former coach of the CSKA Moscow team in the KHL and the Russian national team. He is an ethnic Tatar.

Playing career 
Valeri Bragin started his career with HC Spartak Moscow where he played in the top Soviet league from 1978. In 1981 he joined Khimik Voskresensk where he played for 8 seasons. In 1989 Bragin moved to Denmark where he was the player/coach for Rødovre SIK in the Danish League. He won the Danish title with Rødovre in 1990. In that season he was also named league player of the year. The following season he won a silver medal with Rødovre. In 1992 and 1993 he led the Rødovre team to consecutive bronze medals in the Danish league. Bragin ended his playing career at the age of 38 with Rødovre following the 1993-94 season.

Coaching career 
Having acted as player/coach with Rødovre, Bragin became the full-time coach for the Russian Under-18 junior team which he led to a gold medal at the 2004 IIHF World U18 Championships. The following season he coached the Russian National Junior Team to a silver medal at the 2005 World Junior Ice Hockey Championships.

His first full-time head coach job at the club level came with HC Spartak Moscow in the Russian Superleague for the 2007-08 season. Following a stint as an assistant coach with Atlant Moscow Oblast for the 2009–10 KHL season Bragin returned as the head coach of the Russian National Junior Team in the summer of 2010.

He led the Russian junior team to a gold medal at the 2011 World Junior Ice Hockey Championships in Buffalo, New York, USA.

External links
 

1956 births
Living people
Rødovre Mighty Bulls players
HC Khimik Voskresensk players
Russia men's national ice hockey team coaches
Russian ice hockey coaches
Soviet ice hockey forwards
Soviet expatriate ice hockey players
HC Spartak Moscow players
Honoured Coaches of Russia
Soviet expatriates in Denmark
Russian ice hockey forwards